Rip Van Winkle is a 1903 American short black-and-white silent compilation film written and directed by William K.L. Dickson. It is adapted from the play by his friend and investor Joseph Jefferson with Dion Boucicault based on the 1819 story of the same name by Washington Irving.

Plot
The film features Joseph Jefferson as a ne'er-do-well, who wanders off one day into the Catskill Mountains, where he meets a group of odd men. He drinks some of their mysterious brew and passes out. When he wakes up, he find that 20 years have passed. The film is compiled from a series of films produced in 1896, which consisted of;

Rip's Toast (AM&B Cat. #45)
Rip Meets the Dwarf (AM&B Cat. #46)
Rip and the Dwarf
Rip Leaving Sleepy Hollow (AM&B Cat. #52)
Rip's Toast to Hudson and Crew
Rip's Twenty Years' Sleep (AM&B Cat. #50)
Awakening of Rip
Rip Passing Over Hill

These films were added to the National Film Registry by the Library of Congress in 1995 and featured on the DVD release More Treasures from American Film Archives, 1894-1931.

Production
The serial—filmed at Joseph Jefferson's summer home in Buzzards Bay, Massachusetts in August 1896—was filmed in wide shot with a one or two camera setup in 68 mm format with an aspect ratio of 1.36:1. American Mutoscope and Biograph Co. registered the copyright on February 4, 1897. The actor selected scenes that were largely pantomimed, eliminating the need for explanatory titles.

Release 
The series was one of the films American Mutoscope offered to customers who purchased their projectors in September 1896. Exhibitors had the option of purchasing any or all of the eight scenes and were free to display them in any order. The films were so popular that the production company (which changed its name to the Biograph Company) edited the scenes into a single feature in 1903. Thanks to hit films like The Kiss (1896), Biograph became one of the most popular studios in the United States.

References

External links
 
 

Films directed by William Kennedy Dickson
American silent short films
American black-and-white films
United States National Film Registry films
Films based on Rip Van Winkle
American films based on plays
Films set in New York (state)
Films shot in Massachusetts
Compilation films
1903 films
Articles containing video clips
Biograph Company films
Films based on adaptations
1900s American films